Gorelik or Gorelick is a Jewish occupational surname historically denoting a vodka distiller or trader. Its etymology is Slavic, from Belarusian harelka (гарэлка), a calque from Polish gorzałka, itself from German geprant Wein 'burnt wine'. Morphologically it resembles a Russian adjective meaning 'burnt' with the noun-forming suffix -ik. The latter is sometimes Anglicized, producing -ick. Notable people with the surname include:

Adrián Gorelik (born 1957), Argentine architect
Aleksandr Gorelik (1945–2012), Soviet pair skater
Anastasiya Harelik (born 1991), Belarusian volleyball player
Anatolii Horelik (1890–1956), Ukrainian activist
Gennady Gorelik, Russian physicist and philosopher
Jamie Gorelick (born 1950), American attorney
Kenny G, né Kenneth Gorelick, American saxophonist
Lena Gorelik (born 1981), German writer
Lev Gorelik (born 1992), Russian footballer
Lolita Milyavskaya née Gorelik (born 1963), Russian singer, actress, TV and film director
Mark Harelik (born 1951), American actor
Mikhail Gorelik (born 1958), Soviet swimmer
Mordecai Gorelik (1899–1990), American theatrical designer, producer, and director
Olga Gorelik, American pianist
Sarah Gorelick (1933–2020), American pilot and one of the Mercury 13 female astronauts group
Shirley Gorelick (1924–2000), American artist
Wolf Gorelik (1933–2013), Russian conductor
Victor Gorelick (1941–2020), American comic book editor and executive
Yerucham Gorelick, rabbi
Zalman Gorelik (1908–1987), Belarusian geologist

See also

References 

Americanized surnames
Jewish surnames
Slavic-language surnames
Surnames of Polish origin